Sau Jhooth Ek Sach is a 2005 Hindi-language indie thriller film directed by Bappaditya Roy, the film marks Bappaditya Roy's directorial debut. Produced by Amitabha Singh through the production house Think 16. The film stars Mammootty and Vikram Gokhale. Gokhale plays an industrialist. The film was screened at the 7th Mumbai International Film Festival. The film was a failure at the box office.

Plot 
The films follows Inspector Vivek as he inspects the case of a girl's suicide. He crosschecks members of industrialists Vikrant Pradhan's family. The next day to Pradhan's family surprise, they realize that there is nobody named Vivek and that no girl died.

Cast 
Mammootty as Inspector Vivek
Vikram Gokhale as Vikrant Pradhan
Lilette Dubey
Joy Sengupta 
Neha Dubey as Zoya
Kiran Janjani
Meghna Kothari
Tisca Chopra
Kiran Janjani as Vikrant Pradhan's son
Rajesh Mapuskar

Production
The film marks actor Mammootty's return to Hindi cinema.Mammootty said about his role that "Mine is a very difficult and challenging role; so very unlike a typical Hindi movie cop. In fact, it is completely non-action, and probably my best in the national language." Music Department was handled by Faizal Qureshi, Story written by Pankaj Kapoor and the dialogues by the Director Bappaditya Roy himself.

Reception

Critical response 

Taran Adarsh of Bollywood Hungama wrote that "On the whole, SAU JHOOTH EK SACH - THE UNINVITED has something for the festival circuit, but nothing for the masses". A critic from Sify wrote that "Sau Jhooth Ek Sach' is a film about all of us". Film critic Subhash K. Jha wrote that "Debutant director Bappaditya Roy's morality tale is an arresting ensemble piece" and gave the film two stars out of five. Webindia 123 wrote that "Overall this offbeat film is surely not for the masses but for the select few who dig this genre".

Box office 

According to Box Office India the movie has collected  on its first day. Considering the budget  the movie was average at the box office.

References

2005 films
2000s Hindi-language films